"Moviestar" is a single by Welsh rock band Stereophonics. It was the fourth and final single released from You Gotta Go There to Come Back and the first Stereophonics single released following the sacking of drummer Stuart Cable. The single peaked at number five on the UK Singles Chart, number 26 on the Irish Singles Chart, and number 85 on the Dutch Top 100.

Background
A demo version of the song was released online in 2003 via the band's official website in a section called "The Place", where people would send a mobile phone text message (costing £1) to receive an access code to download the song in MP3 format. Due to high popularity and demand, the song was then fully mastered and finalized and released as a CD and DVD single on 9 February 2004. "Moviestar" was then included on a re-issue of the band's 2003 album, You Gotta Go There to Come Back.

Track listings
UK and European CD1
 "Moviestar" (full-length version) – 4:43
 "Local Boy in the Photograph" (live) – 3:42

UK and European CD2
 "Moviestar" (live) – 4:40
 "The Bartender and the Thief" (live) – 3:47
 "Help Me (She's Out of Her Mind)" (live) – 10:44
 "Behind the Scenes on Tour" (video) – 2:00

UK and European DVD single
 "Moviestar" (video) – 4:04
 "Moviestar" (live) – 4:40
 Behind the scenes footage from the recording of "Moviestar" – 1:59
 "Moviestar" (audio—full-length version) – 4:43
 "Climbing the Wall" (audio—live) – 4:45

Charts

Weekly charts

Year-end charts

Release history

References

2004 singles
2004 songs
Songs written by Kelly Jones
Stereophonics songs
UK Independent Singles Chart number-one singles
V2 Records singles